Fargo's Furniture Store is a specialty store in Kaukauna, Wisconsin. It was added to the National Register of Historic Places for it architectural significance in 1984.

References

Commercial buildings on the National Register of Historic Places in Wisconsin
Neoclassical architecture in Wisconsin
National Register of Historic Places in Outagamie County, Wisconsin
[Bridal Elegance and Formalwear ]